The 2000 NCAA Division I Men's Swimming and Diving Championships were contested in March 2000 at the University Aquatic Center at the University of Minnesota in Minneapolis, Minnesota at the 77th annual NCAA-sanctioned swim meet to determine the team and individual national champions of Division I men's collegiate swimming and diving in the United States.

Along with 2004, this was one of two NCAA championship meets held on a short course meters (25 meters), rather than the NCAA's traditional short-course yards format (25 yards).

Texas topped the team standings, finishing 153 points ahead of Stanford.

Team standings
Note: Top 10 only
(H) = Hosts
(DC) = Defending champions
Full results

See also
List of college swimming and diving teams

References

NCAA Division I Men's Swimming and Diving Championships
NCAA Division I Swimming And Diving Championships
NCAA Division I Men's Swimming And Diving Championships
NCAA Division I Men's Swimming and Diving Championships